Para Innocens is a CD project made by Daniel Sarcos in 1998 for Fundacion Innocens, a charity made to raise awareness for children who have HIV. The album includes two songs recorded by Sarcos, as well as songs from the artists Servando & Florentino, Nelson Arrieta, Pasion Juvenil, Dimension Latina, Guaco, Saned Rivera, Tito Rojas, Oscar D'Leon, La India, and Salserin.

Track listing

References

External links
Fundacion Innocens website

1998 albums